Rotherham Metropolitan Borough Council is the local authority for Rotherham in South Yorkshire, England. The council is elected every four years. Since the last boundary changes in 2004, 63 councillors have been elected from 21 wards.

As part of the government's response to the Rotherham sexual abuses scandal, the Secretary of State for Communities and Local Government, Eric Pickles made an order under the Local Government Act 2000 to switch Rotherham council to holding all-out elections in 2016 and then every fourth year after (the boundaries were not changed). Until then, Rotherham was elected 'in thirds' like other Metropolitan Boroughs, with a third of the council being elected in 3 years out of every 4-year cycle.

Political control
From 1902 to 1974 Rotherham was a county borough, independent of any county council. Under the Local Government Act 1972 it had its territory enlarged and became a metropolitan borough, with South Yorkshire County Council providing county-level services. The first election to the reconstituted borough council was held in 1973, initially operating as a shadow authority before coming into its revised powers on 1 April 1974. South Yorkshire County Council was abolished in 1986 and Rotherham became a unitary authority. Political control of the council since 1973 has been held by the following parties:

Leadership
The leaders of the council since 1990 have been:

Council elections
1998 Rotherham Metropolitan Borough Council election
1999 Rotherham Metropolitan Borough Council election
2000 Rotherham Metropolitan Borough Council election
2002 Rotherham Metropolitan Borough Council election
2003 Rotherham Metropolitan Borough Council election
2004 Rotherham Metropolitan Borough Council election (whole council elected after boundary changes)
2006 Rotherham Metropolitan Borough Council election
2007 Rotherham Metropolitan Borough Council election
2008 Rotherham Metropolitan Borough Council election
2010 Rotherham Metropolitan Borough Council election
2011 Rotherham Metropolitan Borough Council election
2012 Rotherham Metropolitan Borough Council election
2014 Rotherham Metropolitan Borough Council election
2015 Rotherham Metropolitan Borough Council election
2016 Rotherham Metropolitan Borough Council election (whole council elected due to change in electoral system)
2021 Rotherham Metropolitan Borough Council election

By-election results

1993-1997

1997-2001

2001-2005

2005-2009

2013-2016

2016-2021

The 50% vote increase for the Liberal Democrats marked the highest ever swing in their favour since the creation of the council.

2021-present

References

Rotherham election results
By-election results

External links
Rotherham Metropolitan Borough Council

 
Elections in Rotherham
Council elections in South Yorkshire
Rotherham